Tabor is an unincorporated community in Brazos County, in the U.S. state of Texas. According to the Handbook of Texas, the community had a population of 150 in 2000. It is located within the Bryan-College Station metropolitan area.

History
Major M.J. Tabor settled here in 1873 and 12 families were soon living here three years later. A general store was then built in 1884. A post office was established at Tabor inside the general store in 1888 and named the community after himself. The second floor of the building held WoodmenLife meetings and eventually became a dance hall and a recreation center. In 1896, the community had two general stores, a mill, and a gin. It became a postal and business center for other nearby communities such as Blanton, Alexander, Cottonwood, and Walker. Original settlers of the community were Bohemian, German, Anglo, and Black. Italian settlers soon followed around 1900. A cotton gin was built in 1908. Tabor had four businesses, several scattered homes, a church, a cemetery, and 30 residents in 1940. The population grew to 60 in 1950, 90 in 1965, and 150 from 1970 through 2000.

Geography

Education
Private schools were in operation in Tabor until four school districts were established in the area in 1889. Several other schools from the area joined the ones in Tabor in 1915. In 1935, one school had five classrooms and had an enrollment of 126 White students. There were also four one-teacher schools serving a combined total of 159 Black students. It consolidated with the schools in Kurten in 1946, and the school became a community center. Today, the community is served by the Bryan Independent School District.

References

Unincorporated communities in Brazos County, Texas
Unincorporated communities in Texas